Sweet Kiss is a Japanese pop band made up of Saaya Irie, Runa Okada, and Jessica. They have debuted only releasing a couple of songs.

The band rumored its breakup on May 12, 2006. Two of the members, Irie and Okada, went on to form a new trio, named "Chase," with Rio Iguchi. Furthermore, all Chase members starred together in a number of Japanese horror movies. These include Carved (Slit Mouthed Woman) and Shoujo Rei (Girl Ghost).

Music
As Sweet Kiss, in addition to all Sweet Kiss members performing a special audio track in the anime DVD set Class 5-2, Sweet Kiss also released a number of songs for the anime. Note, in the special edition Saaya voiced the role of Chika!
 Baby Love  
 Yakusoku

Movies
 Shoujo Rei
 Slit Mouthed Woman

CM (Commercials)

Anime
 Kyō no Go no Ni

Tributes
 While neither Sweet Kiss nor Chase has put out a lot of music, the music they did release inspired a string of acoustic tributes.
 Yakusoku piano tribute 
 Babylove piano tribute

External links
Sweet Kiss Second Album (broken)
Chase at King Records (broken)

Japanese pop music groups